Shi Yue (born 11 January 1991) is a Chinese professional go player.

Shi won the LG Cup in 2013, defeating Won Seong-jin 2-0 in the final.

In 2015 Shi proceeded to the Samsung Cup Final eventually losing to Ke Jie. In 2019 Shi proceeded to the LG Cup Final, but lost to Yang Dingxin.

Promotion record

Career record

2005: 2 wins, 1 loss
2006: 13 wins, 11 losses
2007: 22 wins, 14 losses
2008: 32 wins, 15 losses
2009: 27 wins, 23 losses
2010: 34 wins, 23 losses
2011: 33 wins, 16 losses
2012: 47 wins, 22 losses
2013: 64 wins, 23 losses
2014: 49 wins, 27 losses
2015: 43 wins, 25 losses
2016: 38 wins, 25 losses
2017: 29 wins, 19 losses
2018: 41 wins, 27 losses
2019: 26 wins, 35 losses
2020: 7 wins, 8 losses

Total: 507 wins, 314 losses (61.8% winning percentage)

Titles and runners-up

Head-to-head record vs selected players
 
Players who have won international go titles in bold.

 Tang Weixing 13:12
  Gu Li 17:7
 Ke Jie 9:12
 Jiang Weijie 14:6
 Tan Xiao 13:6
 Park Junghwan 9:10
  Xie He 9:9
 Zhou Ruiyang 8:8
 Tuo Jiaxi 5:11
 Chen Yaoye 10:5
 Mi Yuting 5:10
 Qiu Jun 10:4
 Wang Xi 7:7
  Kim Jiseok 8:5
 Fan Tingyu 8:5
 Choi Cheolhan 7:6
 Zhong Wenjing 7:5
 Gu Lingyi 6:6
 Lee Sedol 5:7
 Lian Xiao 5:5
 Peng Liyao 4:6
 Mao Ruilong 7:2
 Wang Lei 6:3
 Chang Hao 5:4

References

1991 births
Living people
Chinese Go players